Volodymyr Prokopynenko (born 8 November 1962) is a Ukrainian coach Speranța Nisporeni of Moldovan National Division and former footballer.

Prokopynenko is better known playing for FC Vorskla Poltava with which he started back in 1980. He also spent some time in FC Naftokhimik Kremenchuk that competed in lower leagues.

After retiring, Prokopynenko returned to FC Vorskla Poltava where he managed reserve teams. In 2017 he was appointed the head coach of FC Poltava.

References

External links 
 

1962 births
Living people
Ukrainian footballers
Soviet footballers
Ukrainian expatriate footballers
Expatriate footballers in Bulgaria
FC Vorskla Poltava players
FC Metalist Kharkiv players
FC Naftokhimik Kremenchuk players
Ukrainian football managers
FC Poltava managers
FC Kremin Kremenchuk managers
Speranța Nisporeni managers
Moldovan Super Liga managers
Association football midfielders